This is the list of the number-one singles of the Finnish Singles Chart in 1995.

References

Number-one singles
Finland
1995